Hirișeni is a village in Telenești District, Moldova.

The wooden church of Hirișeni was originally located here.

References

Villages of Telenești District
Orgeyevsky Uyezd